A trywork, located aft of the fore-mast, is the most distinguishing feature of a whaling ship. 

It is a furnace, typically constructed of brick and attached to the deck with iron braces. Two cast-iron trypots are set atop the furnace and used to heat blubber from whales for the recovery of oil. The task is similar to the rendering process for producing lard by heating or frying fatty pork. A reservoir of water under the bricks keeps the furnace from scorching the wood of the deck.

In the 18th and 19th century New England whaling industry, the use of tryworks on whaling ships allowed them to stay at sea longer. Since they could boil out their oil during the voyage, they did not have to carry unprocessed blubber home. Slices of blubber were cut as thinly as possible for the process, and on New England whaling ships, these slices were known as "bible leaves" by the sailors. The ability to use tryworks at sea thus enabled the Yankee whaling industry to flourish.

References 

 Melville, Herman, Moby-Dick, Chapter 96: "The Try-Works".

Further reading 
 "Trying Out the Oil", chapter in the book by Peter Cook, You Wouldn't Want to Sail on a 19th-Century Whaling Ship!, New York : Franklin Watts, 2004. 

Whaling implements